Tibeau Hugo Swinnen (born 11 January 1995) is a Belgian professional footballer who plays as a midfielder for Thes Sport.

References

1995 births
People from Diest
Footballers from Flemish Brabant
Living people
Belgian footballers
Association football midfielders
FC Eindhoven players
Helmond Sport players
Lierse Kempenzonen players
K.V.V. Thes Sport Tessenderlo players
Eerste Divisie players
Challenger Pro League players
Belgian National Division 1 players
Belgian expatriate footballers
Expatriate footballers in the Netherlands
Belgian expatriate sportspeople in the Netherlands